Newingreen is a village near Folkestone in Kent, England. It is situated on the junction of the A20 and the historic Stone Street between Lympne and Canterbury. The village is near Junction 11 of the M20. It is in the civil parish of Stanford.

Transport

Rail
The railway station at Westenhanger is just over half a mile away from the village centre, offering direct links to London Charing Cross via Tonbridge. Passengers may change at Ashford International for faster services to Paris Gare du Nord and London St Pancras International, with a typical total journey time of a little over an hour off peak during the week.

Bus
The route 10 bus operated by Stagecoach East Kent passes through the village between Folkestone and Ashford, typically with an hourly service.

Coach
The National Express service SH021 offers a direct link to London Victoria coach station and Dover from designated stops either side of the A20 in the village centre. The route passes through Ashford and Maidstone on the way towards London, and through Folkestone coastbound.

External links

Villages in Kent